Dolores Airport, also known as Picardo Airport, is an abandoned airport located in Dolores, Eastern Samar. It was built as a military airfield for joint United States and Philippine Commonwealth military forces during World War II, alongside Guiuan Airport.

References 

 
Buildings and structures in Eastern Samar
History of Eastern Samar
Airports in the Philippines
Airfields of the United States Army Air Forces in the Philippines